The Tata Steel Chess Tournament 2022 is the 84th edition of the annual chess tournament held in Wijk aan Zee. It was held from 14 January to 30 January 2022. No visitors were allowed due to the COVID-19 pandemic in the Netherlands. Norwegian GM Magnus Carlsen scored 9.5/13 in the Masters section with 6 wins and 7 draws, thereby winning the tournament for the eighth time in his career. Indian GM Arjun Erigaisi dominated the Challengers section, winning with a score of 10.5/13, with an impressive 8 wins and 5 draws.

Standings

{| class="wikitable sortable" style="text-align: center;"
|+84th Tata Steel Masters, 14–30 January 2022, Wijk aan Zee, Netherlands, Category XX (2736)
! !! Player !! Rating !! class=unsortable| 1 !! class="unsortable" | 2 !! class="unsortable" | 3 !! class="unsortable" | 4 !! class="unsortable" | 5 !! class="unsortable" | 6 !! class="unsortable" | 7 !! class="unsortable" | 8 !! class="unsortable" | 9 !! class="unsortable" | 10 !! class=unsortable| 11 !! class="unsortable" | 12 !! class="unsortable" | 13 !! class="unsortable" | 14 !! Total !! SB !! TPR
|-style="background:#ccffcc;"
| 1 || align=left| || 2865 ||  
|1|| 1 || 1 || ½ || ½ || ½ ||  1|| ½ || ½ || ½ || 1 ||½ || 1|| 9½|| 60.25 || 2904
|-
| 2 || align="left" | || 2767 || 0 ||  || ½ || ½ || ½ || 1 || ½ || ½|| 1 ||  1|| ½ || 1 || ½ || ½ || 8|| 49|| 2819
|-
| 3 || align="left" | || 2763 || 0 
|½||  || ½|| ½ || 1 ||  ½|| 1 || 0 || ½ || ½|| 1 || 1 || 1|| 8 || 47.25|| 2820
|-
| 4 || align="left" | || 2772 || 0 
|½|| ½||  || ½ || 0 || 1 || 1 || ½ || ½ || 1 || ½ || ½|| 1 ||  7½ || 44.5|| 2791
|-
| 5 || align="left" | || 2743 || ½ 
|½|| ½ || ½ ||  || 1 || 0 || ½ || ½ ||  1||  0|| 1 || ½ || ½ || 7 || 45.25|| 2764
|- 
| 6 || align="left" | || 2702 || ½ 
|0|| 0 || 1 || 0 ||  || 0 || ½ || ½|| 1 || 1|| 1 || 1 || ½ || 7 ||  41.75|| 2767
|-
| 7 || align="left" | || 2714 || ½ 
|½||  ½|| 0 || 1 || 1 ||  || ½ || ½ || ½ || ½ || 0|| ½ || ½ || 6½ || 42.75|| 2739
|-
| 8 || align="left" | || 2792 || 0
| ½|| 0 || 0 || ½ || ½ || ½ ||  || 1 || ½ || ½ || 1|| 1 || ½ || 6½ || 37.75 || 2733
|-
| 9 || align="left" | || 2760 || ½ 
|0|| 1 || ½ || ½ || ½|| ½ || 0 ||  || ½ || ½ || ½ || ½|| ½ || 6|| 39.25|| 2708
|-
| 10 || align="left" | || 2727 || ½ 
|0|| ½ || ½ ||  0|| 0 || ½ || ½ || ½ ||  || 1|| 0 || 1|| 1 || 6 || 35.5|| 2709
|-
| 11 || align="left" | || 2708 || ½ 
|½|| ½ || 0 ||  1|| 0|| ½ || ½ || ½ || 0 ||  || ½ || ½ || ½ || 5½ || 36|| 2686
|-
| 12 || align="left" | || 2612 || 0 
|0|| 0 || ½ || 0 || 0 || 1|| 0 || ½ || 1 || ½ ||  || 1 || 1 || 5½ || 30 || 2691
|-
| 13 || align="left" | || 2672 || ½ 
|½|| 0 || ½|| ½ || 0 || ½ || 0 || ½|| 0 || ½ || 0  ||  || 1 || 4½ || 28.5|| 2627
|-
| 14 || align="left" | || 2720 || 0
|½|| 0|| 0|| ½ || ½ || ½ || ½ || ½ || 0 || ½ || 0 || 0 ||  || 3½ || 23.25|| 2560
|}

{|class="wikitable sortable" style="text-align: center;"
|+2022 Tata Steel Challengers, 14–30 January 2022, Wijk aan Zee, Netherlands, Category XIII (2559)
! !! Player !! Rating !! class="unsortable" | 1 !! class="unsortable" | 2 !! class="unsortable" | 3 !! class="unsortable" | 4 !! class="unsortable" | 5 !! class="unsortable" | 6 !! class="unsortable" | 7 !! class="unsortable" | 8 !! class="unsortable" | 9 !! class="unsortable" | 10 !! class="unsortable" | 11 !! class="unsortable" | 12 !!class=unsortable| 13 !! class="unsortable" | 14 !! Total !! SB !! TPR
|-
| 1 || align="left" ||| 2632 ||  || ½|| 1 || ½ ||  ½|| ½ || 1 || 1 || 1 || 1 || 1||  ½|| 1 ||  1|| 10½ || 63 ||2804
|-
| 2 || align="left" | || 2613 || ½||  || 1 || ½ || ½ || ½ || ½ ||  ½|| ½|| ½|| 1 || ½ || 1|| 1 || 8½ || 51.5 ||2667
|-
| 3 || align="left" | || 2586 || 0 || 0 ||  ||  1|| 1 || ½ ||  1|| ½ || 1|| ½ || 1 || ½|| 1 || ½|| 8½ || 50 ||2669
|-
| 4 || align="left" | || 2631 || ½ || ½ || 0||  || 0|| 1 || ½|| ½ || 1 || 1 || ½ || 1|| ½ ||  ½|| 7½ || 45.25 ||2610
|-
| 5 || align="left" | || 2622 || ½|| ½ || 0 || 1||  || 0 || ½ || ½ || 1||  ½|| ½ || 1 ||  ½|| 1 || 7½ || 44.75 ||2611
|-
| 6 || align="left" | || 2539 || ½ || ½ || ½ || 0 || 1 ||  || ½|| ½|| ½ || 1|| 0|| 1 || ½|| ½ || 7 || 44.75 ||2589
|-
| 7 || align="left" | || 2519 || 0 || ½ || 0|| ½|| ½ || ½||  || ½|| ½ || 1 || ½ || 1 || ½ || 1|| 7 || 39.25 ||2591
|-
| 8 || align="left" | || 2607 || 0 || ½|| ½ || ½ || ½ || ½|| ½||  || ½ || 0|| ½|| 1 || ½ || 1 || 6½ || 38.25 ||2558
|-
| 9 || align="left" | || 2627 ||  0 || ½||  0|| 0 ||  0|| ½ || ½ || ½ ||  || ½ || 1 || ½|| 1 ||  1|| 6 || 31.5 ||2530
|-
| 10 || align="left" | || 2532 || 0 || ½|| ½ || 0 || ½||  0|| 0 || 1|| ½ ||  || 0|| 1 || ½ || 1 || 5½ || 31.75 ||2510
|- 
| 11 || align="left" | || 2502 || 0|| 0 || 0 || ½ || ½ || 1|| ½ || ½|| 0 || 1||  || 0 ||  ½|| 0 || 4½ || 28.75 ||2456
|-
| 12 || align="left" | || 2516 || ½|| ½ || ½||  0|| 0 || 0 || 0 || 0 || ½|| 0 || 1 ||  ||  ½|| 1 || 4½ || 26.75 ||2455
|-
| 13 || align="left" | || 2452 || 0 || 0|| 0 || ½ || ½|| ½|| ½ || ½ || 0 || ½ || ½||  ½||  || 0 || 4 || 25 ||2429
|-
| 14 || align="left" | || 2478 || 0|| 0 || ½||  ½|| 0 || ½ || 0|| 0 || 0|| 0 || 1 || 0 || 1 ||  || 3½ || 20 ||2395
|}

Masters results by round

Pairings and results:

 

{| class="wikitable" style="font-size: 90%"
|-
|colspan=7 style="background:#cccccc;" | Round 1 – 15 January 2022
|-
|Vidit Gujrathi || Sam Shankland ||align=center width="30px"| 1–0 
|-
|Fabiano Caruana || Sergey Karjakin ||align=center | ½–½ 
|-
|Daniil Dubov || Shakhriyar Mamedyarov ||align=center | ½–½ 
|-
|Andrey Esipenko || Magnus Carlsen ||align=center | ½–½ 
|-
|Anish Giri || R Praggnanandhaa ||align=center | ½–½ 
|-
|Jan-Krzysztof Duda || Richárd Rapport ||align=center | 1–0 
|-
|Jorden van Foreest || Nils Grandelius ||align=center | 1–0 
|-
|colspan=7 style="background:#cccccc;" | Round 2 – 16 January 2022
|-
| Sam Shankland (0) || Nils Grandelius (0) ||align=center | ½–½ 
|-
| Richárd Rapport (0) || Jorden van Foreest (1) ||align=center | 1–0 
|-
| R Praggnanandhaa (½) || Jan-Krzysztof Duda (1) ||align=center | ½-½  
|-
| Magnus Carlsen (½) || Anish Giri (½) ||align=center | 1–0 
|-
| Shakhriyar Mamedyarov (½) || Andrey Esipenko (½) ||align=center | ½–½  
|-
| Sergey Karjakin (½) || Daniil Dubov (½) ||align=center | ½–½  
|-
| Vidit Gujrathi (1) || Fabiano Caruana (½) ||align=center | ½–½  
|-
|colspan=7 style="background:#cccccc;" | Round 3 – 17 January 2022
|-
| Fabiano Caruana (1) || Sam Shankland (½) ||align=center | ½–½   
|-
| Daniil Dubov (1) || Vidit Gujrathi (1½) ||align=center | 0–1
|-
| Andrey Esipenko (1) || Sergey Karjakin (1) ||align=center | 1–0 
|-
| Anish Giri (½) || Shakhriyar Mamedyarov (1) ||align=center | ½–½ 
|-
| Jan-Krzysztof Duda (1½) || Magnus Carlsen (1½) ||align=center | ½–½ 
|-
| Jorden van Foreest (1) || R Praggnanandhaa (1) ||align=center | 1–0 
|-
| Nils Grandelius (½) || Richárd Rapport (1) ||align=center | 0–1 
|-
|colspan=7 style="background:#cccccc;" | Round 4 – 18 January 2022
|-
| Sam Shankland (1) || Richárd Rapport (2) ||align=center | ½–½ 
|-
| R Praggnanandhaa (1) || Nils Grandelius (½) ||align=center | 1–0  
|-
| Magnus Carlsen (2) || Jorden van Foreest (2) ||align=center | ½–½  
|-
| Shakhriyar Mamedyarov (1½) || Jan-Krzysztof Duda (2) ||align=center | 1–0 
|-
| Sergey Karjakin (1) || Anish Giri (1) ||align=center | ½–½ 
|-
| Vidit Gujrathi (2½) || Andrey Esipenko (2) ||align=center | ½–½  
|-
| Fabiano Caruana (1½) || Daniil Dubov (1) ||align=center |  ½–½ 
|-
|colspan=7 style="background:#cccccc;" | Round 5 – 20 January 2022
|-
| Daniil Dubov (1½) || Sam Shankland (1½) ||align=center | ½–½  
|-
| Andrey Esipenko (2½) || Fabiano Caruana (2) ||align=center |  ½–½  
|-
| Anish Giri (1½) || Vidit Gujrathi (3) ||align=center | ½–½ 
|-
| Jan-Krzysztof Duda (2) || Sergey Karjakin (1½) ||align=center | ½–½ 
|-
| Jorden van Foreest (2½) || Shakhriyar Mamedyarov (2½) ||align=center | 0–1  
|-
| Nils Grandelius (½) || Magnus Carlsen (2½) ||align=center |  ½–½ 
|-
| Richárd Rapport (2½) || R Praggnanandhaa (2) ||align=center | 1–0 
|-
|colspan=7 style="background:#cccccc;" | Round 6 – 21 January 2022
|-
|  (2) || R Praggnanandhaa (2) ||align=center | ½–½   
|-
| Magnus Carlsen (3) || Richárd Rapport (3½) ||align=center | 1–0  
|-
| Shakhriyar Mamedyarov (3½) || Nils Grandelius (1) ||align=center | ½–½
|-
| Sergey Karjakin (2) || Jorden van Foreest (2½) ||align=center | 1-0
|-
| Vidit Gujrathi (3½) || Jan-Krzysztof Duda (2½)||align=center | ½–½ 
|-
| Fabiano Caruana (2½) || Anish Giri (2) ||align=center | 0–1 
|-
| Daniil Dubov (2) || Andrey Esipenko (3) ||align=center | ½–½  
|-
|colspan=7 style="background:#cccccc;" | Round 7 – 22 January 2022
|-
| Andrey Esipenko (3½) || Sam Shankland (2½) ||align=center | ½–½  
|-
| Anish Giri (3) || Daniil Dubov (2½) ||align=center | 1–0
|-
| Jan-Krzysztof Duda (3) || Fabiano Caruana (2½) ||align=center | 0–1 
|-
| Jorden van Foreest (2½) || Vidit Gujrathi (4) ||align=center | 1–0 
|-
| Nils Grandelius (1½) || Sergey Karjakin (3) ||align=center | ½–½ 
|-
| Richárd Rapport (3½) || Shakhriyar Mamedyarov (4) ||align=center | ½–½  
|-
| R Praggnanandhaa (2½) ||  (4) ||align=center | 0–1  
|-
|}

{| class="wikitable" style="font-size: 90%"
|-
|colspan=7 style="background:#cccccc;" | Round 8 – 23 January 2022
|-
| Sam Shankland (3) || Magnus Carlsen (5) ||align=center width="30px" | ½–½ 
|-
| Shakhriyar Mamedyarov (4½) || R Praggnanandhaa (2½) ||align=center | 1–0 
|-
| Sergey Karjakin (3½) || Richárd Rapport (4) ||align=center | ½–½ 
|-
| Vidit Gujrathi (4) || Nils Grandelius (2) ||align=center | 1–0
|-
| Fabiano Caruana (3½) || Jorden van Foreest (3½) ||align=center | ½–½ 
|-
| Daniil Dubov (2½) || Jan-Krzysztof Duda (3) ||align=center | ½–½ 
|-
| Andrey Esipenko (4) || Anish Giri (4) ||align=center | 0–1 
|-
|colspan=7 style="background:#cccccc;" | Round 9 – 25 January 2022
|-
| Anish Giri (5)|| Sam Shankland (3½) ||align=center |  1–0
|-
| Jan-Krzysztof Duda (3½) || Andrey Esipenko (4) ||align=center | ½–½  
|-
| Jorden van Foreest (4) || Daniil Dubov (3) ||align=center |  ½–½ 
|-
| Nils Grandelius (2) || Fabiano Caruana (4) ||align=center | 0–1
|-
| Richárd Rapport (4½) || Vidit Gujrathi (5) ||align=center | ½–½ 
|-
| R Praggnanandhaa (2½) || Sergey Karjakin (4) ||align=center | 0–1 
|-
| Magnus Carlsen (5½) || Shakhriyar Mamedyarov (5½) ||align=center | 1–0
|-
|colspan=7 style="background:#cccccc;" | Round 10 – 26 January 2022
|-
| Sam Shankland (3½) || Shakhriyar Mamedyarov (5½) ||align=center | ½–½ 
|-
| Sergey Karjakin (5) || Magnus Carlsen (6½) ||align=center | ½–½ 
|-
| Vidit Gujrathi (5½) || R Praggnanandhaa (2½)||align=center | 0-1
|-
| Fabiano Caruana (5) || Richárd Rapport (5)||align=center | 0–1 
|-
| Daniil Dubov (3½) || Nils Grandelius (2)||align=center | 0–1  
|-
| Andrey Esipenko (4½)|| Jorden van Foreest (4½) ||align=center | 1–0  
|-
| Anish Giri (6) || Jan-Krzysztof Duda (4) ||align=center | ½–½ 
|-
|colspan=7 style="background:#cccccc;" | Round 11 – 28 January 2022
|-
| Jan-Krzysztof Duda (4½)|| Sam Shankland (4)||align=center | ½–½  
|-
| Jorden van Foreest (4½)|| Anish Giri (6½)||align=center | 1–0  
|-
| Nils Grandelius (3)|| Andrey Esipenko (5½)||align=center | ½–½
|-
| Richárd Rapport (6)|| Daniil Dubov (3½) ||align=center | 1–0
|-
| R Praggnanandhaa (3½)|| Fabiano Caruana (5)||align=center | 0–1 
|-
| Magnus Carlsen (7)|| Vidit Gujrathi (5½)||align=center | ½–½ 
|-
| Shakhriyar Mamedyarov (6)|| Sergey Karjakin (5½)||align=center | ½–½  
|-
|colspan=7 style="background:#cccccc;" | Round 12 – 29 January 2022
|-
| Sam Shankland (4½) || Sergey Karjakin (6) ||align=center | 1–0  
|-
| Vidit Gujrathi (6)||  ||align=center | 0–1  
|-
| Fabiano Caruana (6) || Magnus Carlsen (7½)||align=center | 0–1  
|-
| Daniil Dubov (3½) || R Praggnanandhaa (3½) ||align=center | 0–1
|-
| Andrey Esipenko (6) || Richárd Rapport (7) ||align=center | ½–½
|-
| Anish Giri (6½) || Nils Grandelius (3½) ||align=center | ½–½
|-
| Jan-Krzysztof Duda (5) || Jorden van Foreest (5½) ||align=center | ½–½  
|-
|colspan=4 style="background:#cccccc;" | Round 13 – 30 January 2022
|-
| Jorden van Foreest (6) || Sam Shankland (5½) ||align=center | 1–0  
|-
| Nils Grandelius (4) || Jan-Krzysztof Duda (5½) ||align=center | ½–½  
|-
| Richárd Rapport (7½) || Anish Giri (7) ||align=center | ½–½
|-
| R Praggnanandhaa (4½) || Andrey Esipenko (6½) ||align=center | 1–0
|-
| Magnus Carlsen (8½) || Daniil Dubov (3½) ||align=center | 1–0
|-
| Shakhriyar Mamedyarov (7½) || Fabiano Caruana (6) ||align=center | ½–½
|-
|  || Vidit Gujrathi (6) ||align=center | 1–0  
|-
|}

Notes
 Dubov forfeited his match in Round 7 against Anish Giri due to COVID-19 contamination in his inner circle and his refusal to wear a mask. He was allowed to play again without a mask after several tests including a PCR returned negative.

 Dubov tested positive for COVID-19 prior to Round 11, hence he was forced to forfeit his games against Rapport, Praggnanandhaa, and Carlsen respectively.

References

External links 

Tata Steel Chess Tournament
2022 in chess
2022 in Dutch sport
 January 2022 sports events in the Netherlands